The Mass Ave Cultural Arts District, colloquially known as Mass Ave, is one of seven designated cultural districts in Indianapolis, Indiana, United States. The avenue is one of the four original diagonal streets included in Alexander Ralston's plan of 1821. Mass Ave also contains the Massachusetts Avenue Commercial District, a historic district included on the National Register of Historic Places since 1982.

Today it lies at the heart of the city's arts district. It offers some of the city's most visible theaters and art galleries as well as a number of shops and eateries.

Gentrification in the 1990s propelled the area from squalor to one of the city's more fashionable addresses. Currently, redevelopment of Mass Ave focuses on fostering locally owned shops, theaters, and restaurants.

Massachusetts Avenue Commercial District

Landmarks
Athenæum (Das Deutsche Haus): building houses Young Actors Theatre and the Rathskeller Restaurant, the city's oldest restaurant still in operation. 
Old National Centre: is the headquarters of the Indianapolis Ancient Arabic Order of the Nobles of the Mystic Shrine.

References

External links 

Mass Ave Merchants Association
Massachusetts Avenue Historic District, National Park Service website

Neighborhoods in Indianapolis
Culture of Indianapolis
Streets in Indianapolis
1821 establishments in Indiana
Historic districts on the National Register of Historic Places in Indiana
National Register of Historic Places in Indianapolis